Lawaqa Park is a rugby union stadium in Sigatoka, Fiji.  The stadium has a nominal capacity of 12,000 people.  It currently hosts rugby union matches as well as local football matches.
It is currently playing host to the 2019 Nadroga 10's Provincial Rugby Union competition.

References

Football venues in Fiji
Nadroga-Navosa Province
Rugby league stadiums in Fiji
Rugby union stadiums in Fiji
Sports venues completed in 1997
1997 establishments in Fiji
Fijian Drua